Archduchess Maria Luisa of Austria (30 August 1798 – 15 June 1857) was an Archduchess of Austria and Princess of Bohemia, as the daughter of Ferdinand III, Grand Duke of Tuscany and Luisa of Naples and Sicily.

Biography 
Archduchess Maria Luisa Giuseppa Cristina Rosa was born on 30 August 1798, in Florence. She was the second child and first daughter borne to Ferdinand III, Grand Duke of Tuscany and his wife Luisa of Naples and Sicily. Her mother was the niece of the ill-fated queen of France, Marie Antoinette. By birth she was an Archduchess of Austria and a Princess of Bohemia. She grew up in Italy and Austria. 

Since her birth, Maria Luisa was disabled and suffered from a deformity. Due to this, she was affectionately called “the little hunchback”.

Maria Luisa and her family were known to have made regular visitations to Pisa, since 1814. She never married, or had children. 

She died on 15 June 1857, aged 58.

References 

1798 births
1857 deaths
Maria Luisa
Italian princesses
Maria Luisa
Nobility from Florence
Burials at San Lorenzo, Florence
Daughters of monarchs